Ceren Sözeri Özdal, is a Turkish academician. She has been working as an associate professor in the Department of Communications of Galatasaray University since 2004. Her fields of work are ownership of the media, media policies, and discrimination in media, hate speech, freedom of speech and the press in Turkey. She has been Ethical Journalism Network's Turkey representative since 2015. She also wrotes as a columnist for Evrensel.

She was sued for an article she wrote in which she criticised Sabah-ATV group and Anadolu Agency for publishing "fake news" during 2019 Istanbul Mayoral Elections. EVP of Turkuvaz Media Group, Serhat Albayrak, requested  to be paid for "damaging their commercial standing".

References 

 

Living people
Year of birth missing (living people)
Turkish women academics
Academic staff of Galatasaray University